Scampolo (German: Scampolo, ein Kind der Straße) is a 1932 German comedy film directed by Hans Steinhoff and starring Dolly Haas, Karl Ludwig Diehl and Oskar Sima. The film is an adaptation of the Italian play Scampolo by Dario Niccodemi, which has been turned into numerous films. It was shot at the Sievering Studios in Vienna.

Cast
 Dolly Haas as Scampolo 
 Karl Ludwig Diehl as Maximilian 
 Oskar Sima as Philippe 
 Paul Hörbiger as Gabriel  
 Hedwig Bleibtreu as Frau Schmid

See also
 Scampolo (1928)
 Scampolo (1958)

References

Bibliography 
 Hake, Sabine. Popular Cinema of the Third Reich. University of Texas Press, 2001.

External links 
 

1932 films
Films of the Weimar Republic
German comedy films
1932 comedy films
1930s German-language films
Films scored by Franz Waxman
Films directed by Hans Steinhoff
Films with screenplays by Billy Wilder
German multilingual films
Bavaria Film films
German black-and-white films
German films based on plays
1932 multilingual films
1930s German films
Films shot at Sievering Studios